The debye (symbol: D) is a CGS unit (a non-SI metric unit) of electric dipole moment named in honour of the physicist Peter J. W. Debye. It is defined as  statcoulomb-centimeters. Historically the debye was defined as the dipole moment resulting from two charges of opposite sign but an equal magnitude of 10−10 statcoulomb (generally called e.s.u. (electrostatic unit) in older scientific literature), which were separated by 1 ångström. This gave a convenient unit for molecular dipole moments.

{|
|-
|height=30|1 D ||= 10−18 statC·cm 
|-
|height=30|
|= 10−18 cm5/2⋅g1/2⋅s−1 
|-
|height=30|
|= 10−10 statC·Å 
|-
|height=30|
|≘  C·m
|-
|height=30|
|≈ 
|-
|height=30|
|≈  
|-
|height=30|
|≈ 
|-
|height=30|
|≈ 
|-
|}

Typical dipole moments for simple diatomic molecules are in the range of 0 to 11 D. Symmetric homoatomic species, e.g. chlorine, Cl2, have zero dipole moment, and highly ionic molecular species have a very large dipole moment, e.g. gas-phase potassium bromide, KBr, with a dipole moment of 10.41 D. A proton and an electron 1Å apart have  a dipole moment of 4.8 D.

The debye is still used in atomic physics and chemistry because SI units have until recently been inconveniently large. The smallest SI unit of electric dipole moment is the quectocoulomb-metre, which corresponds to roughly 0.3 D.

See also
 Buckingham (unit) (CGS unit of electric quadrupole)

Notes

References

Non-SI metric units
Peter Debye
Centimetre–gram–second system of units